The Croatian National Guard ( or ZNG) was an armed force established by Croatia in April and May 1991 during the Croatian War of Independence. Although it was established within the framework of the Ministry of the Interior for legal reasons, the ZNG was under the direct command of the Ministry of Defence. It was tasked with the protection of Croatia's borders and territory, and with tasks normally associated with police forces. The ZNG was formed with the transfer of special police units to the ZNG, establishing four all-professional brigades in May 1991, and was presented to the public in a military parade in Zagreb on 28 May. It was commanded by Defence Minister General Martin Špegelj before his resignation in early August. Špegelj was replaced by General Anton Tus, who became the first head of the General Staff of the Armed Forces of the Republic of Croatia (established on 21 September).

During its development the ZNG experienced a number of problems, including shortages of weapons and ammunition, lack of uniforms, inadequate training and an overall deficiency in trained officers, and poor staff work and command structures (preventing the effective coordination of multiple units). These problems were offset by good morale, clear objectives and high levels of mobilisation. After the Battle of the Barracks, the ZNG expanded significantly with arms captured from the Yugoslav People's Army (Jugoslovenska Narodna Armija). By the end of October 60 new brigades and independent battalions were established, and on 3 November the ZNG was renamed the Croatian Army (Hrvatska vojska).

Background

In 1990, after the electoral defeat of the government of the Socialist Republic of Croatia by the Croatian Democratic Union (HDZ), ethnic tensions between Croats and Croatian Serbs worsened. The Yugoslav People's Army ( – JNA) believed that Croatia would use the Croatian Territorial Defence Force's ( – TO) equipment to build its own army and confront the JNA. To minimize the expected resistance, the JNA confiscated the TO's weapons. On 17 August tensions escalated into an open revolt by the Croatian Serbs, centred on the predominantly Serb-populated areas of the Dalmatian hinterland near the southern town of Knin, parts of the Lika, Kordun and Banovina regions and eastern Croatia. They established a Serbian National Council in July 1990 to coordinate opposition to Croatian President Franjo Tuđman's policy of pursuing independence for Croatia. Milan Babić, a dentist from Knin, was elected president and Knin police chief Milan Martić established paramilitary militias. The two men eventually became the political and military leaders of the SAO Krajina, a self-declared state incorporating the Serb-inhabited areas of Croatia.

The JNA learned about Croatia's intention to develop its own military force from JNA Captain Vladimir Jager, a double agent employed by Croatia and the JNA Counterintelligence Service (KOS). The JNA devised Operation Shield (Štit), aimed at disarming the Croatian forces and the arrest and trial of the Croatian leadership, in response. Although the operation was prepared by December 1990, federal Defence Minister General Veljko Kadijević never sought authorisation to carry it out from the Yugoslav Presidency. Instead, he ordered the KOS to stand down on the morning the operation was scheduled to begin.

At the beginning of 1991 Croatia had no regular army, and to bolster its defence Croatia doubled the size of its police force to about 20,000. The most effective part of the force was the 3,000-strong special police, deployed in a military organisation of 12 battalions; in addition, there were 9,000–10,000 regionally-organised reserve police officers. Although the reserve police were set up in 16 battalions and 10 companies,  they lacked weapons (which were needed to arm the troops).

History

Establishment

Preparations for the ZNG began on 12 April 1991. Its formation as a police force with military capability was considered necessary by Croatian authorities after March clashes in Pakrac and at Plitvice Lakes and the possibility of further confrontation with the JNA. Since it was illegal to establish a separate military in a constituent republic of Yugoslavia, the ZNG was planned as part of the police force under the Ministry of the Interior. Parliament amended the Internal Affairs Act on 18 April, and the ZNG was formally established five days later. It was tasked with the protection of the constitutional order, the maintenance of public order, anti-terrorist operations, the protection of Croatia's borders, territory, coast and territorial waters, valuable structures and high-profile individuals. Although the ZNG was formally subordinate to the Ministry of the Interior, its founding legislation stipulated that it would be commanded by the Ministry of Defence.

On 5 May the number of ZNG troops and their composition was determined, followed by operational guidelines issued by Defence and Interior Ministers Martin Špegelj and Josip Boljkovac for the transfer of police personnel to the ZNG on 10 May. By 15 May several special police units (SPUs) transferred to the ZNG, forming four brigades. By July the ZNG had approximately 8,000 troops and, unlike other Croatian forces, were fully equipped with small arms. The reserve police force, numbering about 39,000 in April, was also transferred to reserve ZNG brigades and independent battalions. On 18 May the Zrinski Battalion was established as a special forces unit of the ZNG, its core consisting of 27 volunteers drawn from the Kumrovec SPU. Initially, it also relied on former French Foreign Legion troops. By July, the reserve force of 40,000 ZNG troops was assigned to 19 brigades and 14 independent battalions; however, they did not possess sufficient heavy or small arms for all their personnel. The Croatian police had approximately 15,000 small arms, with less than 30,000 additional weapons obtained from abroad by August.

On 28 May, the ZNG was presented to the public in a military parade at the Kranjčevićeva Street Stadium to boost morale. The parade featured approximately 800 soldiers, a dozen anti-aircraft systems, armoured cars and several armoured personnel carriers; the Presidential Guards and Alkars also participated.

Development problems
To command individual units, regional ZNG commands were established in eastern Slavonia, the Banovina–Kordun area, Lika, central and northern Dalmatia, southern Dalmatia and Zagreb in late July and August. Crisis headquarters, which also had command authority of ZNG units, were established down to the municipal level. The command structure was particularly poor, preventing effective coordination between units. Although the many crisis headquarters were entrusted with a high level of authority, they consisted of politicians with little (if any) military training other than JNA service. Multiple units deployed to a single area often had no authority coordinating their activities. TO command systems were reactivated in some places (such as Zagreb), somewhat improving the situation.

Other problems faced by the ZNG included a shortage of trained officers, inadequate troop training, a shortage of weapons and especially a shortage of ammunition. Mobilisation proved particularly successful, however, and troops were plentiful; in Zagreb, approximately 80 percent of those called up in September and October reported for service. The ZNG were short of uniforms; 20 percent of those drafted in Zagreb during this period received uniforms, while the remainder fought in civilian clothes. The ZNG also relied on the civilian infrastructure for food, fuel and medical care.

Špegelj was replaced by Šime Đodan as Defence Minister in July. He remained in command of the ZNG until 3 August, when he resigned over Tuđman's refusal to authorise attacks against JNA barracks. After Špegelj's resignation, command of the ZNG was entrusted to General Anton Tus.

Transition to the Croatian Army

In mid-September the regional commands were replaced by six operational zones, headquartered in Osijek, Bjelovar, Zagreb, Karlovac, Rijeka and Split. The zones possessed uneven strength; those in Slavonia and Dalmatia were heavily equipped, and the Zagreb zone had twice the average troop strength. After capturing a stockpile of weapons during the Battle of the Barracks, the ZNG expanded to 60 reserve brigades and independent battalions by the end of October (in addition to the four all-professional guards brigades). Although each brigade was planned to have 1,800 troops, in reality their size varied from 500 to 2,500. Three named special-forces battalions were also established within the ZNG (in addition to the Zrinski Battalion): the Frankopan, Kralj Tomislav and Matija Vlačić Battalions.

On 20 September Parliament enacted the Defence Act, specifying that the ZNG and the Croatian Army (Hrvatska vojska – HV) comprised the Armed Forces of the Republic of Croatia. At the same time, the armed forces were formally subordinated to the Ministry of Defence rather than the Ministry of the Interior. The legislation also designated the TO reserve units as a constituent part of the ZNG reserve force. The following day the General Staff of the Armed Forces of the Republic of Croatia was established, headed by Tus. On 8 October (the day Croatia declared its independence) the Defence Act was amended, with the ZNG redefined as a part of the HV. ZNG reserve units became the HV reserve, named the Home Guard (Domobranstvo), leaving the ZNG an all-professional force. The ZNG was renamed the HV on 3 November 1991.

Service
ZNG units participated is a number of significant battles in the early part of the war, attempting to hold back Yugoslav forces. These include the battles of Gospić, Šibenik and Zadar, where the ZNG defended cities in Lika and along the Dalmatian coast against the JNA and its allies. The ZNG also took part in the battles of Vukovar and Osijek in eastern Slavonia, defended Dubrovnik and contributed to the capture of the JNA barracks and Operation Hurricane-91 (an attempt to push the JNA out of western Slavonia.

Legacy
The HV continued to grow, numbering about 200,000 troops by the end of 1991. Although the force successfully countered the JNA that year, the HV was deficient in organisation, training and heavy-weapons support. By the end of 1991, the HV still lacked sufficient resources to push back the JNA and continued experiencing inadequate work by their staff. Nonetheless, like the ZNG it benefited from its troops' high morale and the well-defined purpose of its mission. The growth and systematic improvement of HV capability accelerated in 1992, continuing throughout the Croatian War of Independence. The anniversary of the ZNG parade at the Kranjčevićeva Street Stadium is celebrated annually in Croatia as Armed Forces Day and Croatian Army Day.

Footnotes

References
Books

Scientific journal articles

News reports

Other sources

1991 establishments in Croatia
National Guard
National Guard
Military units and formations disestablished in 1991
Military units and formations established in 1991